Glycerophosphohydrolase may refer to:
 
 Glycerophosphoinositol glycerophosphodiesterase
 Glycerophosphocholine phosphodiesterase
 Glycerol-1,2-cyclic-phosphate 2-phosphodiesterase
 Glycerophosphodiester phosphodiesterase